The WANK Worm was a computer worm that attacked DEC VMS computers in 1989 over the DECnet. It was written in DIGITAL Command Language.

Origin
The worm is believed to have been created by Melbourne-based hackers, the first to be created by an Australian or Australians. The Australian Federal Police thought the worm was created by two hackers who used the names Electron and Phoenix. Julian Assange may have been involved, but this has never been proven.

Political message
The WANK worm had a distinct political message attached, and it was the first major worm to have a political message. WANK in this context stands for Worms Against Nuclear Killers. The following message appeared on infected computer's screen:

The worm coincidentally appeared on a DECnet network operated by NASA days before the launch of a NASA Space Shuttle carrying the Galileo spacecraft. At the time, there were protests by anti-nuclear groups regarding the use of the plutonium-based power modules in Galileo. The protesters contended that if this shuttle blew up as Challenger did three years earlier in 1986, the plutonium spilled would cause widespread death to residents of Florida.

The worm propagated through the network pseudo-randomly from one system to the other by using an algorithm which converted the victim machine's system time into a candidate target node address (composed of a DECnet Area and Node number) and subsequently attempted to exploit weakly secured accounts such as SYSTEM and DECNET that had password identical to the usernames. The worm did not attack computers within DECnet area 48, which was New Zealand. A comment inside the worm source code at the point of this branch logic indicated that New Zealand was a nuclear-free zone. New Zealand had recently forbidden U.S. nuclear-powered vessels from docking at its harbours, thus further fueling the speculation inside NASA that the worm attack was related to the anti-nuclear protest. The line "You talk of times of peace for all, and then prepare for war" is drawn from the lyrics of the Midnight Oil song "Blossom and Blood". Midnight Oil are an Australian rock band known for their political activism and opposition to both nuclear power and nuclear weapons. The process name of the second version of the worm to be detected was "oilz", an Australian shorthand term for the band.

Playful nature

DECnet networks affected included those operated by the NASA Space Physics Analysis Network (SPAN), the US Department of Energy's High Energy Physics Network (HEPnet), CERN, and Riken. The only separation between the networks was a prearranged division of network addresses (DECnet "Areas"). Thus, the worm, by picking a random target address, could affect all infected networks equally. The worm code included 100 common VAX usernames that were hard-coded into its source code. In addition to its political message, the worm contained several features of an apparently playful nature. The words "wank" and "wanked" are slang terms used in many countries to refer to masturbation. In addition, the worm contained "over sixty" randomizable messages that it would display to users, including "Vote anarchist" and "The FBI is watching YOU". The worm was also programmed to trick users into believing that files were being deleted by displaying a file deletion dialogue that could not be aborted, though no files were actually erased by the worm.

anti-WANK and WANK_SHOT
R. Kevin Oberman (from DOE) and John McMahon (from NASA) wrote separate versions of an anti-WANK procedure and deployed them into their respective networks. If one was found, the worm would destroy itself.

A second version of WANK was released on October 22. Unlike the previous version of WANK, this version was designed to actually damage the computers it infected, rather than only falsely claim to do so, and would alter the passwords of infected computers. Like the previous version of WANK, this program would utilise the RIGHTSLIST database to find new computers to infect. The program WANK_SHOT was designed by Bernard Perrow of the Institut de physique nucléaire d'Orsay, to rename RIGHTLIST and replace it with a dummy database. This would cause WANK to go after the dummy, which could be designed with a hidden logic bomb. WANK_SHOT was then provided to the system administrators of affected networks to be installed onto their computers. It still took weeks for the worm to be completely erased from the network.

See also
 Father Christmas (computer worm)

References

External links

Advisory from Virus Test Center, University of Hamburg, Germany

"Juvenile Delinquents or International Saboteurs?" presented by Suelette Dreyfus at the Internet Crime conference held in Melbourne, 16–17 February 1998, by the Australian Institute of Criminology

"Hacktivism and Politically Motivated Computer Crime" - Written by one of the Digital Equipment Corporation investigators; disputes the WANK worm had any political motivation but was rather a play on the British meaning of the word "wank"

Computer worms
Wikipedia articles with ASCII art
Hacking in the 1980s